Vug is a cavity in a rock.

Vug may also refer to:

A Titanian individual in Philip K. Dick's science fiction novel The Game-Players of Titan
An acronym for Vivendi Universal Games.
Track 2 on side one of the album, Death Walks Behind You, by Atomic Rooster.
A monster that hides under the narrator's rug in the Dr. Seuss book There's a Wocket in My Pocket.